Adrian J. Luckman is a British glaciologist and professor of geography at Swansea University in Wales. He is a lead researcher for Project Midas, which monitored the Larsen C iceberg and the Larsen Ice Shelf.

Biography 
Luckman received a Bachelor of Science and a DPhil in electronic engineering from the University of York in 1987 and 1991, respectively.  he holds a personal chair in the Geography department at Swansea University.

References

External links 

 

Living people
British glaciologists
York University alumni
Academics of Swansea University
Year of birth missing (living people)